John Rankine (born Douglas Rankine Mason; 26 September 1918 – 8 August 2013) was a British science fiction author, who wrote books as John Rankine and Douglas R. Mason. Rankine was born in Hawarden, Flintshire, Wales and first attended Chester Grammar School and in 1937 went to study English Literature and Experimental Psychology at the University of Manchester, where he was a friend of Anthony Burgess (mentioned in Little Wilson and Big God, Burgess's autobiography).

We know little of his life until 1966, when his first short stories and novels were published while he was in his mid-forties. The novels have a very 1960s and 1970s feel to them. One theme he worked with was that of a shorter life span, possibly borrowed from William F. Nolan's Logan's Run, but while the background and theme seemed similar, The Resurrection of Roger Diment took the concept in a totally different direction.

Rankine also wrote television novels in the Space: 1999 universe.

Bibliography

Novels
From Carthage Then I Came a.k.a. Eight Against Utopia (1966)
Ring of Violence (1968)
The Tower of Rizwan (1968)
Landfall is a State of Mind (1968)
The Weisman experiment (1969)
The Janus Syndrome (1969)
Matrix (1969)
Horizon Alpha (1971)
Dilation Effect (1971)
Satellite 54-Zero (1971)
The Resurrection of Roger Diment (1972)
The End Bringers (1973)
The Phaeton Condition (1973)
Operation Umanaq (1973)
The Omega Worm (1976)
Pitman's Progress (1976)
Euphor Unfree (1977)
Mission to Pactolus R. (1978)
The Typhon Intervention (1981)
In the Eye of the Storm (2001)
The Darkling Plain (2001)

Series
Dag Fletcher
 The Blockade of Sinitron (1966) [as by John Rankine]
 Interstellar Two-Five (1966) [as by John Rankine]
 One is One (1968) [as by John Rankine]
 The Plantos Affair (1971) [as by John Rankine]
 The Ring of Garamas (1972) [as by John Rankine]
 The Bromius Phenomenon (1973) [as by John Rankine]

Space 1999
2 Moon Odyssey (1975) [as by John Rankine]
5 Lunar Attack (1975) [as by John Rankine]
6 Astral Quest (1975) [as by John Rankine]
8 Android Planet (1976) [as by John Rankine]
10 Phoenix of Megaron (1976) [as by John Rankine]

Space Corporation
 Never the Same Door (1968) [as by John Rankine]
 Moons of Triopus (1968) [as by John Rankine]

Also
Binary Z (1969) [as by John Rankine]

Collections
 Tuo Yaw (2003)
 BAZOZZ ZZZ DZZ: And Other Short Stories (2003)

Anthologies containing stories by Douglas R Mason
 New Writings in SF 7 (1966)
 New Writings in SF 9 (1966)
 New Writings in SF 11 (1968)
 New Writings in SF 16 (1969)
 New Writings in SF 21 (1972)

Short stories
 "Folly to Be Wise" (1966)		
 "The Man Who Missed the Ferry" (1966)		
 "There Was This Fella..." (1968)
 "Locust Years" (1968)		
 "All Done by Mirrors" (1969)		
 "Algora One Six" (1972)
 "Second Run at the Data" (1971)

Notes

External links
 
 Fantastic Fiction UK
 Golden Apple, Wallasey
 Douglas R. Mason 1918–2013
 
 Douglas R. Mason at LC Authorities, 2 records, and at WorldCat

1918 births
2013 deaths
British science fiction writers
People educated at The King's School, Chester
Alumni of the University of Manchester
20th-century British novelists
People from Hawarden
20th-century pseudonymous writers